Vladimir Ilyin may refer to:

 Vladimir Ilyin (footballer, born 1928) (1928–2009), Soviet footballer
 Vladimir Ilyin (actor) (born 1947), Russian actor
 Vladimir Ilyin (footballer, born 1992), Russian footballer
 Vladimir Ilyin (mathematician) (1928—2014), Russian mathematician